The blockchain-based database is a combination of traditional database and distributed database where data is transacted and recorded via Database Interface (also known as Compute Interface) supported by multiple-layers of blockchains. The database itself is shared in the form of an encrypted/immutable ledger which makes the information open for everyone.

Concept 
In actual case, the blockchain essentially has no querying abilities when compared to traditional database and with a doubling of nodes, network traffic quadruples with no improvement in throughput, latency, or capacity. To overcome these shortcomings, taking a traditional database and adding blockchain features to it sounds more feasible. That's how the concept of blockchain-based database came into existence, which consists of multiple member clouds riding on two primary layers; the first one is Database Interface and the second one is the Blockchain Anchoring. The idea behind the blockchain based database concept is to complement the functionality and features of SQL and NoSQL databases with blockchain properties: data immutability, integrity assurance, decentralized control, Byzantine fault tolerance and transaction traceability.

Iterations

 Blockchain relational database – a hybrid database model.
 Graphchain Database – a standard RDF Graph database protected by a Blockchain.

References

Blockchains
Database models
Decentralization